Hammock Park may refer to:

Hammock Park (Dunedin, Florida), a park in Dunedin, Florida
 Matheson Hammock Park, a 630acre urban park in metropolitan Miami 
 Hammocks Beach State Park, a North Carolina state park in Onslow County
 Simpson Park Hammock, a 7.8 acre urban park located between Brickell and The Roads neighborhoods of Miami 
 Highlands Hammock State Park, a 9000-acre park west of Sebring in Highlands County, Florida
San Felasco Hammock Preserve State Park, a Florida State Park in Alachua County, Florida 
Curry Hammock State Park, a Florida State Park along both sides of US 1 
 Dagny Johnson Key Largo Hammock Botanical State Park, a Florida State Park on the northern tip of Key Largo
 Annutteliga Hammock, a 2,200 acre  park and preserve in Hernando County, Florida
 Fickett Hammock Preserve